Pomacea decussata is a species of freshwater snail in the family Ampullariidae. 

It was first described by Stéfano Moricand as Ampullaria decussata in 1836. Pomacea commissionis was originally considered a subspecies of P. decussata.

References 

 Simone, L. R. L. (2006). Land and Freshwater Molluscs of Brazil. Editora Grafíca Bernardi, FAPESP. São Paulo, 390 pp.

External links
 Cowie, R. H. & Thiengo, S. C. (2003). The apple snails of the Americas (Mollusca: Gastropoda: Ampullariidae: Asolene, Felipponea, Marisa, Pomacea, Pomella): A nomenclatural and type catalog. Malacologia. 45(1): 41-100

decussata
Freshwater snails
Taxa named by Moïse Étienne Moricand
Gastropods described in 1836